Maskinongé may refer to:

 Maskinongé, Quebec
 Maskinongé Regional County Municipality
 Maskinongé (Province of Canada), an electoral district 1853–1867
 Maskinongé (electoral district), in Quebec 1867–1925
 Maskinongé (provincial electoral district), in Quebec 1867–present
 Muskellunge, a species of freshwater fish of North America